The heather shrew (Crocidura erica) is a species of mammal in the family Soricidae. It is endemic to Angola.

Sources

Mammals of Angola
Crocidura
Endemic fauna of Angola
Mammals described in 1915
Taxonomy articles created by Polbot